The men's 81 kg judo competition at the 2020 Summer Paralympics was held on 28 August 2021 at the Nippon Budokan.

Japan's Aramitsu Kitazono was scheduled to compete in the round of 16 event of the men's 81 kg category. However, he was forced to withdraw at the last minute two days before his scheduled event after sustaining injuries to his head and legs during an accident which happened on 26 August 2021 at the Paralympics athletes village. It was revealed that Aramitsu was hit by an e-Pallette driverless vehicle when he was walking on the Pedestrian crossing and the vehicle was blamed for its technical fault. His opponent Dmytro Solovey of Ukraine automatically qualified to the quarterfinals as a result of Aramitsu's late withdrawal.

Results

Bracket

Repechage

References

External links
 
 Draw Sheet

M81
Judo at the Summer Paralympics Men's Half Middleweight